Lepidochrysops penningtoni, the Pennington's blue, is a species of butterfly in the family Lycaenidae. It is endemic to South Africa, where it is found in the Succulent Karoo of the Northern Cape.

The wingspan is 28–34 mm for males and 34–36 mm for females. Adults are on wing from August to October. There is one generation per year, with the adults only emerging after rain.

References

Lepidochrysops
Butterflies described in 1969
Endemic butterflies of South Africa
Taxonomy articles created by Polbot